The Bolivian squirrel (Sciurus ignitus) is a tree squirrel that is endemic to South America. Little is known of the species, which may represent a species complex.

Description
The fur is mostly dark olive with black and yellow ticking and fading to pale grey or whitish on the chest and underparts. There are faint rings of buff-coloured fur around the eyes and distinct patches of buff fur on the backs of the ears. Females have three pairs of teats.

Distribution and habitat
Bolivian squirrels live along the eastern edge of the Andes from Peru, through Bolivia and Brazil to extreme northern Argentina. Precise details of its habitat are not clear, although it has been found in both lowland and montane tropical forests from  elevation.

Five subspecies are recognised:
 S. i. ignitus - northern Bolivia
 S. i. argentinius - Argentina
 S. i. boliviensis - central and southern Bolivia
 S. i. cabrerai - known from a single partial specimen from Brazil
 S. i. irroratus - Peru, western Brazil

Behaviour and biology
Bolivian squirrels are diurnal and spend the day moving through the understory and subcanopy of the forest. They are omnivorous, feeding on a mixture of nuts, fruits, fungi, and insects. Juveniles have been captured in June and July, and pregnant mothers in August, which may suggest that they breed during the dry season.

References

4. Timm, R. M., J. L. Cartes, M. Ruiz-Díaz, R. Zárate, and R. H. Pine. (2015). Distribution and ecology of squirrels (Rodentia: Sciuridae) in Paraguay, with first country records for Sciurus ignitus. Southwestern Naturalist 60(1):121–127.

Sciurus
Mammals of the Andes
Mammals of Argentina
Mammals of Bolivia
Mammals of Brazil
Mammals of Peru
Mammals described in 1867
Taxa named by John Edward Gray